The men's 100 metre freestyle competition of the swimming events at the 1959 Pan American Games took place on 31 August (preliminaires) and 2 September (finals). The last Pan American Games champion was Clarke Scholes of US.

This race consisted of two lengths of the pool, both lengths being in freestyle.

Results
All times are in minutes and seconds.

Heats
The first round was held on August 31.

Final 
The final was held on September 2.

References

Swimming at the 1959 Pan American Games